Phacellanthus is a monotypic genus of flowering plants belonging to the family Orobanchaceae. The only species is Phacellanthus tubiflorus.

Its native range is China to Russian Far East and Japan.

References

Orobanchaceae
Orobanchaceae genera
Monotypic Lamiales genera